Zorkun is a yayla (summer resort) in Osmaniye Province, Turkey.
Zorkun is on the south east of Osmaniye, the distance being . On the way to Zorkun there are a number of minor settlements like Olukbaşı which are also used as yayla. 

At the present Zorkun is a summer resort. The area around Zorkun is suitable for winter sports and in the future Zorkun may also be a center of winter tourism.

References

Yaylas in Turkey
Tourist attractions in Osmaniye Province
Populated places in Osmaniye Province